The Oksøy-class mine hunters are a class of vessels of the Royal Norwegian Navy active since the mid-1990s.

The minehunters carry two ROV's, and when in active service a few highly trained divers, with competence in mine clearing. While the minesweepers have only one rigid inflatable boat, the Oksøy-class carries two, one for the divers and one for other purposes.

Ships

Service history
HNoMS Oksøy was damaged when it ran aground in 2005.

See also

References

External links
Oksøy and Alta class
Alta / Oksoy Surface Effect Ship (SES)

Mine warfare vessel classes
Minehunters of the Royal Norwegian Navy